Misamis Occidental's 2nd congressional district is one of the two congressional districts of the Philippines in the province of Misamis Occidental. It has been represented in the House of Representatives since 1987. The district encompasses the southern half of the province consisting of its largest city, Ozamiz, the adjacent city of Tangub, and the municipalities of Bonifacio, Clarin, Don Victoriano Chiongbian, Sinacaban and Tudela. It is currently represented in the 19th Congress by Sancho Fernando Oaminal of the Nacionalista Party (NP).

Representation history

Election results

2022

2019

2016

2013

2010

See also
Legislative districts of Misamis Occidental

References

Congressional districts of the Philippines
Politics of Misamis Occidental
1987 establishments in the Philippines
Congressional districts of Northern Mindanao
Constituencies established in 1987